Paul Curtis may refer to:

Paul Curtis (footballer) (born 2003), Australian rules footballer
Paul Curtis (ice hockey) (born 1947), Canadian ice hockey defenceman
Paul Curtis (musician) (born 1950), English singer, songwriter and record producer
Paul Curtis (shipbuilder) (1800–1873), American shipbuilder
Paul Curtis House, house in Medford, Massachusetts, USA

See also